Bogátradvány (Bogát-Radván, Bogát-Radvány) was the name of a gens (Latin for "clan"; nemzetség in Hungarian) in the Kingdom of Hungary. The powerful Rákóczi family ascended from this genus.

The Cseleji, Monoki, Dobi, Körtvélyessy, Hosszúmezei, Lukács, Morvay, Osvald, Posai, Bekecs and Isépy families also originated from the gens Bogátradvány.

Origins 
Lászlo Makkai, a Hungarian historian, through his work, Transylvania in the Medieval Hungarian Kingdom (896-1526), mentions the tribes regarding Bogát (Bugat rex) as a Gyula of the Magyar tribal confederation. Supporting the writings of Simon of Kéza, that the Bogátradvány Clan, being of Bohemian origins, means that the origin is the Keszi tribe. Simon of Kéza explains the origins of the Bogátradvány Clan are during Migration Period, as the tribe of Keszi settled in the East during the Hungarian conquests in Europe. The family of Bogát has its origins somewhere in the 300s Eastern Europe within the ruling family of the tribe of Keszi, one of the seven Magyar tribes.

Notable Members of the Clan
 Bogát (fl. 919-922), Gyula of the Magyar tribes, Prince
 Radvány (died after 1071), Palatine (1067-1071)
 Ipoch (died after 1222), ban of Slavonia (1204; 1222), voivode of Transylvania (1216–1217)
 Albert (died after 1239), Vice-Palatine (1236–1239)
 Illés Monoky (born 1217-1277 - c. 1290), founder of the Monok family
 Pál Chyz (died 1282), Hungarian Archbishop
 Miklós Monoky de Monok II (died 1643), Captain of Ónod (After 1607), Baron of Monok (1625–1643)
 Miklós Monoky de Monok III (fl. 1625), Captain of Ónod (After Miklós II), Baron (1625 until death)

References

Sources
 János Karácsonyi: A magyar nemzetségek a XIV. század közepéig. Budapest: Magyar Tudományos Akadémia. 1900–1901.
 Gyula Kristó (editor): Korai Magyar Történeti Lexikon - 9-14. század (Encyclopedia of the Early Hungarian History - 9-14th centuries); Akadémiai Kiadó, 1994, Budapest; .
 László Makkai: Transylvania in the Medieval Hungarian Kingdom (896-1526). https://mek.oszk.hu/03400/03407/html/67.html.
 László Makkai: Transylvania in the Medieval Hungarian Kingdom (896-1526). https://mek.oszk.hu/03400/03407/html/66.html.
 Timothy Reuter, The New Cambridge Medieval History: c. 900-c. 1024, Cambridge University Press, 1995, p. 543–545, 

 
Hungarian nobility